Ireland uses the Nomenclature of Territorial Units for Statistics (NUTS) geocode standard for referencing country subdivisions for statistical purposes. The standard is developed and regulated by the European Union. The NUTS standard is instrumental in delivering European Structural and Investment Funds. The NUTS code for Ireland is IE and a hierarchy of three levels is established by Eurostat. A further level of geographic organisation, the local administrative unit (LAU), in Ireland is the local electoral area.

Overview

NUTS levels 1, 2 and 3
The most recent revision of NUTS regions was made in 2016 and took effect in 2018. The eligibility of regions for funding under the European Regional Development Fund and the European Social Fund Plus was revised in 2021. NUTS 2 Regions may be classified as less developed regions, transition regions, or more developed regions.

Demographic statistics by NUTS 3 region

Local administrative units
The local administrative units in Ireland are the local electoral areas. These are subdivisions of local government areas used for local elections. In counties outside Dublin and in the cities and counties, they also form the basis of municipal districts within local authorities.

Regional Assemblies
Each of the three NUTS 2 regions has a Regional Assembly. These are divided into strategic planning areas, which correspond to the NUTS 3 regions. Prior to 2014, the eight NUTS 3 regions had Regional Authorities. The 2014 act abolished these and transferred their functions to the Regional Assemblies. Assembly members are nominated by constituent local authorities from among their elected councillors.

See also
 ISO 3166-2 codes of Ireland
 FIPS region codes of Ireland
 List of Irish regions by Human Development Index
 Local government in the Republic of Ireland

Sources
 LAU codes
 Hierarchical list of the Nomenclature of territorial units for statistics - NUTS and the Statistical regions of Europe
 Overview map of EU Countries - NUTS level 1
 NUTS Maps 2016
 Correspondence between the NUTS levels and the national administrative units

References

Ireland
 1 NUTS
Ireland
Ireland